On September 1, 2018, UTair Flight 579, a Boeing 737-800 on a scheduled domestic flight from Moscow to Sochi, Russia, with 164 passengers and 6 crew, overran the runway and caught fire while landing at Sochi, injuring 18 occupants. One airport employee died of a heart attack.

Aircraft and crew 
The aircraft involved in the accident was a Boeing 737-8AS with serial number 29937 and Bermudan registration VQ-BJI. It was delivered in 2002 to Ryanair and operated until it was retired in 2009. It was subsequently leased by Atlant-Soyuz Airlines in 2010. The airline rebranded as Moscow Airlines the same year and ceased operations shortly afterwards in January 2011. Finally, UTair leased the aircraft since mid-2011 until it crashed.

The 51-year-old captain Alexei Alekseevich Shnyrev had 13,995 flight hours, including 6,391 hours on the Boeing 737. The 53-year-old first officer Sergei Eduardovich Ivanov had 12,277 flight hours, with 5,147 of them on the Boeing 737. Both pilots were type rated on both the Boeing 737 Classic and Next Generation variants and had completed crew resource management training. The first officer had also undergone windshear training in May 2018.

Accident 
The flight departed from Vnukovo Airport at 12:30 am local time with 166 passengers and six crew. The flight crew aborted the first two approaches to Sochi before committing to a third that resulted in the overrun. The aircraft touched down at 2:57 am and overran runway 06, came to rest on the bed of the Mzymta River and caught fire, prompting an evacuation.

Eighteen occupants were injured; injuries included burns and carbon monoxide poisoning. Transportation Minister Yevgeny Dietrich confirmed that an airport employee died of a heart attack during the emergency response.

Thunderstorms were reported over Sochi at the time of the accident. The aircraft received damage to its belly, wings and engines. The airport operator reported that the fire was extinguished within eight minutes.

Investigation 
An accident investigation was launched by the Interstate Aviation Committee (IAC) of Russia. Two days after the crash on September 3, the IAC reported that the flight recorders had been recovered from the aircraft, the data were retrieved successfully and would be analyzed. The committee completed examination of the accident site and was making preparations for moving the aircraft. The United States National Transportation Safety Board, representing the State of Design and State of Manufacture of the aircraft, and the United Kingdom's Air Accidents Investigation Branch, representing the State of Registry, were invited to participate in the investigation.

The Investigative Committee of Russia also launched a probe into the crash, with a Southern Transport Department official stating that "a criminal investigation has been opened into the emergency landing ... on suspicion of inadequate services with a risk to clients' health."

The IAC released a preliminary report on November 6, 2018.

On December 12, 2019 the IAC released their final report on the accident. The cause of the accident was the flight crew ignoring repetitive windshear warnings when the aircraft experienced low-level horizontal windshear and the crew's decision to land on the runway when its conditions at the time of the accident prohibited doing so. Contributing factors included violation of standard operation procedures, improper use of the autopilot, poor crew resource management training, and late deployment of the spoilers.

See also 

 Runway excursion
 Pegasus Airlines Flight 2193

Notes

References

External links
 Interstate Aviation Committee
Boeing 737-800 VQ-BJI 01.09.2018
Final report
Boeing 737-800 VQ-BJI 01.09.2018  – the Russian version is the report of record.
Preliminary report 
Final report 

2018 disasters in Russia
21st century in Sochi
Accidents and incidents involving the Boeing 737 Next Generation
Aviation accidents and incidents in 2018
Aviation accidents and incidents in Russia
September 2018 events in Europe
September 2018 events in Russia
Airliner accidents and incidents caused by microbursts